Edmund Munroe Smith (December 8, 1854 – April 13, 1926) was an American jurist and historian.

Family and education
Smith was born in Brooklyn, New York, the son of Horatio Southgate Smith and his wife, Susan Dwight Munroe. He received his A.B. from Amherst College in 1874 and his LL.B. from Columbia Law School in 1877.  In 1879, Smith returned to Amherst to earn an A.M. degree. He received the degree of J.U.D. from the University of Göttingen in 1880.

In 1890, Smith married Emma Gertrude Huidekoper, daughter of General Henry S. Huidekoper. They had one daughter, Gertrude Munroe Smith, born in 1891. Smith's brother, Henry Maynard Smith (he changed his name to Henry Smith Munroe), was also a professor at Columbia, and served as Dean of the School of Mines from 1891 to 1915.  Smith's great-granddaughter is Meg Whitman, former CEO of eBay and candidate for Governor of California.

Career
Smith filled several posts at Columbia University from 1880 onwards. He was a lecturer in Roman law and an instructor in history from 1880 to 1883. He was promoted to adjunct professor of history in 1883, and became a full professor of Roman law and comparative jurisprudence in 1891. Smith was one of the founders of the Political Science Quarterly, and served as its managing editor from 1886 to 1893 and again from 1904 to 1913.

He retired from teaching in 1924 and died of pneumonia in 1926 at the age of seventy-one.

Publications
His works include:

He wrote articles on Roman law and cognate subjects for the New International Encyclopedia.

Notes

External links
 

American legal writers
American legal scholars
Historians from New York (state)
Columbia Law School alumni
People from Brooklyn
1854 births
1926 deaths
Deaths from pneumonia in the United States